Micromax Canvas 2 Plus A110Q is a dual-sim Android smartphone by Micromax Mobile launched in May 2013 featuring a 1.2 GHz Quad-core processor, 1 GB of RAM and a 5.0 IPS LCD screen. It supersedes Micromax Canvas 2 A110 with improvements primarily in CPU, RAM and front camera.

References 

Android (operating system) devices
Smartphones
Micromax Mobile
Mobile phones introduced in 2013
Discontinued smartphones